This is a list of the mammal species recorded in Belize. Of the mammal species in Belize, two are endangered, three are vulnerable, and three are near threatened. One species has been classified as extinct.

The following tags are used to highlight each species' conservation status as assessed by the International Union for Conservation of Nature:

Some species were assessed using an earlier set of criteria. Species assessed using this system have the following instead of near threatened and least concern categories:

Subclass: Theria

Infraclass: Metatheria

Order: Didelphimorphia (common opossums)

Didelphimorphia is the order of common opossums of the Western Hemisphere. Opossums probably diverged from the basic South American marsupials in the late Cretaceous or early Paleocene. They are small to medium-sized marsupials, about the size of a large house cat, with a long snout and prehensile tail.

Family: Didelphidae (American opossums)
Subfamily: Caluromyinae
Genus: Caluromys
 Derby's woolly opossum, Caluromys derbianus VU
Subfamily: Didelphinae
Genus: Chironectes
 Water opossum, Chironectes minimus LR/nt
Genus: Didelphis
 Common opossum, Didelphis marsupialis LR/lc
 Virginia opossum, Didelphis virginiana LR/lc
Genus: Marmosa
 Alston's mouse opossum, Marmosa alstoni LR/nt
 Mexican mouse opossum, Marmosa mexicana LR/lc
 Robinson's mouse opossum, Marmosa robinsoni LR/lc
Genus: Philander
 Gray four-eyed opossum, Philander opossum LR/lc

Infraclass: Eutheria

Order: Sirenia (manatees and dugongs)

Sirenia is an order of fully aquatic, herbivorous mammals that inhabit rivers, estuaries, coastal marine waters, swamps, and marine wetlands. All four species are endangered.

Family: Trichechidae
Genus: Trichechus
 West Indian manatee, Trichechus manatus VU

Order: Cingulata (armadillos)

The armadillos are small mammals with a bony armored shell. They are native to the Americas. There are around 20 extant species.

Family: Dasypodidae (armadillos)
Subfamily: Dasypodinae
Genus: Dasypus
 Nine-banded armadillo, Dasypus novemcinctus LC
Subfamily: Tolypeutinae
Genus: Cabassous
 Northern naked-tailed armadillo, Cabassous centralis DD

Order: Pilosa (anteaters, sloths and tamanduas)

The order Pilosa is extant only in the Americas and includes the anteaters, sloths, and tamanduas.

Suborder: Vermilingua
Family: Cyclopedidae
Genus: Cyclopes
 Silky anteater, C. didactylus LC
Central American silky anteater, C. dorsalis 
Family: Myrmecophagidae (American anteaters)
Genus: Myrmecophaga
 Giant anteater, Myrmecophaga tridactyla VU possibly extirpated
Genus: Tamandua
 Northern tamandua, Tamandua mexicana LC

Order: Primates

The order Primates contains humans and their closest relatives: lemurs, lorisoids, tarsiers, monkeys, and apes.

Suborder: Haplorhini
Infraorder: Simiiformes
Parvorder: Platyrrhini
Family: Atelidae
Subfamily: Alouattinae
Genus: Alouatta
 Yucatán black howler, Alouatta pigra EN
Subfamily: Atelinae
Genus: Ateles
 Geoffroy's spider monkey, Ateles geoffroyi LC

Order: Rodentia (rodents)

Rodents make up the largest order of mammals, with over 40% of mammalian species. They have two incisors in the upper and lower jaw which grow continually and must be kept short by gnawing. Most rodents are small though the capybara can weigh up to 45 kg (100 lb).

Suborder: Hystricomorpha
Family: Erethizontidae (New World porcupines)
Subfamily: Erethizontinae
Genus: Coendou
 Mexican hairy dwarf porcupine, Coendou mexicanus LR/lc
Family: Dasyproctidae (agoutis and pacas)
Genus: Dasyprocta
 Central American agouti, Dasyprocta punctata LR/lc
Family: Cuniculidae
Genus: Cuniculus
 Lowland paca, Cuniculus paca LC
Suborder: Sciurognathi
Family: Sciuridae (squirrels)
Subfamily: Sciurinae
Tribe: Sciurini
Genus: Sciurus
 Deppe's squirrel, Sciurus deppei LR/lc
 Yucatan squirrel, Sciurus yucatanensis LR/lc
Family: Geomyidae
Genus: Orthogeomys
 Hispid pocket gopher, Orthogeomys hispidus LR/lc
Family: Cricetidae
Subfamily: Tylomyinae
Genus: Nyctomys
 Sumichrast's vesper rat, Nyctomys sumichrasti LR/lc
Genus: Otonyctomys
 Hatt's vesper rat, Otonyctomys hatti LR/lc
Genus: Ototylomys
 Big-eared climbing rat, Ototylomys phyllotis LR/lc
Genus: Tylomys
 Peters's climbing rat, Tylomys nudicaudus LR/lc
Subfamily: Neotominae
Genus: Peromyscus
 Mexican deer mouse, Peromyscus mexicanus LR/lc
Genus: Reithrodontomys
 Slender harvest mouse, Reithrodontomys gracilis LR/lc
Subfamily: Sigmodontinae
Genus: Oligoryzomys
 Fulvous pygmy rice rat, Oligoryzomys fulvescens LR/lc
Genus: Oryzomys
 Alfaro's rice rat, Oryzomys alfaroi LR/lc
 Coues' rice rat, Oryzomys couesi LR/lc
 Long-nosed rice rat, Oryzomys rostratus LR/lc
 Cloud forest rice rat, Oryzomys saturatior LR/lc
Genus: Rhipidomys
 Splendid climbing mouse, Rhipidomys nitela LR/lc
Genus: Sigmodon
 Toltec cotton rat, Sigmodon toltecus LC

Order: Lagomorpha (lagomorphs)

The lagomorphs comprise two families, Leporidae (hares and rabbits), and Ochotonidae (pikas). Though they can resemble rodents, and were classified as a superfamily in that order until the early 20th century, they have since been considered a separate order. They differ from rodents in a number of physical characteristics, such as having four incisors in the upper jaw rather than two.

Family: Leporidae (rabbits, hares)
Genus: Sylvilagus
 Eastern cottontail, Sylvilagus floridanus LR/lc
Central American tapetí, Sylvilagus gabbi LC

Order: Eulipotyphla (shrews, hedgehogs, moles, and solenodons)

Eulipotyphlans are insectivorous mammals. Shrews and solenodons closely resemble mice, hedgehogs carry spines, while moles are stout-bodied burrowers.

Family: Soricidae (shrews)
Subfamily: Soricinae
Tribe: Blarinini
Genus: Cryptotis
 North American least shrew, Cryptotis parva LR/lc

Order: Chiroptera (bats)

The bats' most distinguishing feature is that their forelimbs are developed as wings, making them the only mammals capable of flight. Bat species within Belize account for about 58% of the mammals.

Family: Noctilionidae
Genus: Noctilio
 Greater bulldog bat, Noctilio leporinus LR/lc
Family: Vespertilionidae
Subfamily: Myotinae
Genus: Myotis
 Elegant myotis, Myotis elegans LR/nt
 Hairy-legged myotis, Myotis keaysi LR/lc
Subfamily: Vespertilioninae
Genus: Bauerus
 Van Gelder's bat, Bauerus dubiaquercus VU
Genus: Eptesicus
 Argentine brown bat,  Eptesicus furinalis LR/lc
Genus: Lasiurus
 Red bat, Lasiurus blossevillii LR/lc
 Southern yellow bat, Lasiurus ega LR/lc
 Northern yellow bat, Lasiurus intermedius LR/lc
Family: Molossidae
Genus: Eumops
 Wagner's bonneted bat, Eumops glaucinus LR/lc
 Underwood's bonneted bat, Eumops underwoodi LR/nt
Genus: Molossus
 Velvety free-tailed bat, Molossus molossus LR/lc
 Alvarez's mastiff bat, Molossus alvarezi LR/lc
Genus: Nyctinomops
 Broad-eared bat, Nyctinomops laticaudatus LR/lc
Family: Emballonuridae
Genus: Balantiopteryx
 Thomas's sac-winged bat, Balantiopteryx io LR/nt
Genus: Peropteryx
 Lesser doglike bat, Peropteryx macrotis LR/lc
 Greater dog-like bat, Peropteryx kappleri LR/lc
Genus: Rhynchonycteris
 Proboscis bat, Rhynchonycteris naso LR/lc
Genus: Saccopteryx
 Greater sac-winged bat, Saccopteryx bilineata LR/lc
 Lesser sac-winged bat, Saccopteryx leptura LR/lc
Family: Mormoopidae
Genus: Mormoops
 Ghost-faced bat, Mormoops megalophylla LR/lc
Genus: Pteronotus
 Naked-backed bat, Pteronotus davyi LR/lc
 Big naked-backed bat, Pteronotus gymnonotus LR/lc
 Parnell's mustached bat, Pteronotus parnellii LR/lc
 Wagner's mustached bat, Pteronotus personatus LR/lc
Family: Phyllostomidae
Subfamily: Phyllostominae
Genus: Lampronycteris
 Yellow-throated big-eared bat, Lampronycteris brachyotis LR/lc
Genus: Lonchorhina
 Tomes's sword-nosed bat, Lonchorhina aurita LR/lc
Genus: Lophostoma
 Pygmy round-eared bat, Lophostoma brasiliense LR/lc
 Davis's round-eared bat, Lophostoma evotis LR/nt
Genus: Macrophyllum
 Long-legged bat, Macrophyllum macrophyllum LR/lc
Genus: Micronycteris
 Schmidts's big-eared bat, Micronycteris schmidtorum LR/lc
Genus: Mimon
 Striped hairy-nosed bat, Mimon crenulatum LR/lc
Genus: Phylloderma
 Pale-faced bat, Phylloderma stenops LR/lc
Genus: Phyllostomus
 Pale spear-nosed bat, Phyllostomus discolor LR/lc
 Greater spear-nosed bat, Phyllostomus hastatus LR/lc
Genus: Tonatia
 Stripe-headed round-eared bat, Tonatia saurophila LR/lc
Genus: Trachops
 Fringe-lipped bat, Trachops cirrhosus LR/lc
Genus: Trinycteris
 Niceforo's big-eared bat, Trinycteris nicefori LR/lc
Genus: Vampyrum
 Spectral bat, Vampyrum spectrum LR/nt
Subfamily: Glossophaginae
Genus: Glossophaga
 Commissaris's long-tongued bat, Glossophaga commissarisi LR/lc
 Pallas's long-tongued bat, Glossophaga soricina LR/lc
Genus: Hylonycteris
 Underwood's long-tongued bat, Hylonycteris underwoodi LR/nt
Genus: Lichonycteris
 Dark long-tongued bat, Lichonycteris obscura LR/lc
Subfamily: Carolliinae
Genus: Carollia
 Seba's short-tailed bat, Carollia perspicillata LR/lc
 Sowell's short-tailed bat, Carollia sowelli LR/lc
Subfamily: Stenodermatinae
Genus: Artibeus
 Artibeus intermedius LR/lc
 Jamaican fruit bat, Artibeus jamaicensis LR/lc
 Great fruit-eating bat, Artibeus lituratus LR/lc
 Pygmy fruit-eating bat, Artibeus phaeotis LR/lc
 Toltec fruit-eating bat, Artibeus toltecus LR/lc
Genus: Centurio
 Wrinkle-faced bat, Centurio senex LR/lc
Genus: Chiroderma
 Hairy big-eyed bat, Chiroderma villosum LR/lc
Genus: Sturnira
 Little yellow-shouldered bat, Sturnira lilium LR/lc
Genus: Uroderma
 Tent-making bat, Uroderma bilobatum LR/lc
Genus: Vampyressa
 Southern little yellow-eared bat, Vampyressa pusilla LR/lc
Genus: Vampyrodes
 Great stripe-faced bat, Vampyrodes caraccioli LR/lc
Genus: Platyrrhinus
 Heller's broad-nosed bat, Platyrrhinus helleri LR/lc
Subfamily: Desmodontinae
Genus: Desmodus
 Common vampire bat, Desmodus rotundus LR/lc
Genus: Diaemus
 Hairy-legged vampire bat, Diphylla ecaudata LR/nt
Family: Thyropteridae
Genus: Thyroptera
 Spix's disk-winged bat, Thyroptera tricolor LR/lc

Order: Cetacea (whales)

The order Cetacea includes whales, dolphins and porpoises. They are the mammals most fully adapted to aquatic life with a spindle-shaped nearly hairless body, protected by a thick layer of blubber, and forelimbs and tail modified to provide propulsion underwater.

Suborder: Mysticeti
Family: Balaenopteridae (baleen whales)
Genus: Balaenoptera 
 Common minke whale, Balaenoptera acutorostrata
 Sei whale, Balaenoptera borealis
 Bryde's whale, Balaenoptera brydei
 Blue whale, Balaenoptera musculus
Genus: Megaptera
 Humpback whale, Megaptera novaeangliae
Suborder: Odontoceti
Superfamily: Platanistoidea
Family: Delphinidae (marine dolphins)
Genus: Delphinus
 Short-beaked common dolphin, Delphinus delphis DD
Genus: Feresa
 Pygmy killer whale, Feresa attenuata DD
Genus: Globicephala
 Short-finned pilot whale, Globicephala macrorhyncus DD
Genus: Lagenodelphis
 Fraser's dolphin, Lagenodelphis hosei DD
Genus: Grampus
 Risso's dolphin, Grampus griseus DD
Genus: Orcinus
 Killer whale, Orcinus orca DD
Genus: Peponocephala
 Melon-headed whale, Peponocephala electra DD
Genus: Pseudorca
 False killer whale, Pseudorca crassidens DD
Genus: Stenella
 Pantropical spotted dolphin, Stenella attenuata DD
 Clymene dolphin, Stenella clymene DD
 Striped dolphin, Stenella coeruleoalba DD
 Atlantic spotted dolphin, Stenella frontalis DD
 Spinner dolphin, Stenella longirostris DD
Genus: Steno
 Rough-toothed dolphin, Steno bredanensis DD
Genus: Tursiops
 Common bottlenose dolphin, Tursiops truncatus
Family: Physeteridae (sperm whales)
Genus: Physeter
 Sperm whale, Physeter catodon DD
Family: Kogiidae (dwarf sperm whales)
Genus: Kogia
 Pygmy sperm whale, Kogia breviceps DD
 Dwarf sperm whale, Kogia sima DD
Superfamily Ziphioidea
Family: Ziphidae (beaked whales)
Genus: Mesoplodon
 Gervais' beaked whale, Mesoplodon europaeus DD)
Genus: Ziphius
 Cuvier's beaked whale, Ziphius cavirostris DD

Order: Carnivora (carnivorans)

There are over 260 species of carnivorans, the majority of which feed primarily on meat. They have a characteristic skull shape and dentition. 
Suborder: Feliformia
Family: Felidae (cats)
Subfamily: Felinae
Genus: Herpailurus
 Jaguarundi, Herpailurus yagouaroundi LC
Genus: Leopardus
 Ocelot, Leopardus pardalis LC
 Margay, Leopardus wiedii LC
Genus: Puma
 Cougar, Puma concolor NT
Subfamily: Pantherinae
Genus: Panthera
 Jaguar, Panthera onca NT
Suborder: Caniformia
Family: Canidae (dogs, foxes)
Genus: Canis
 Coyote, Canis latrans LC
Genus: Urocyon
 Gray fox, Urocyon cinereoargenteus LC
Family: Procyonidae (raccoons)
Genus: Bassariscus
 Cacomistle, Bassariscus sumichrasti LR/nt
Genus: Nasua
 White-nosed coati, Nasua narica LR/lc
Genus: Potos
 Kinkajou, Potos flavus LR/lc
Genus: Procyon
 Common raccoon, Procyon lotor LR/lc
Family: Mustelidae (mustelids)
Genus: Eira
 Tayra, Eira barbara LR/lc
Genus: Galictis
 Greater grison, Galictis vittata LR/lc
Genus: Lontra
 Neotropical river otter, Lontra longicaudis NT
Genus: Neogale
 Long-tailed weasel, Neogale frenata LR/lc
Family: Mephitidae
Genus: Conepatus
 Striped hog-nosed skunk, Conepatus semistriatus LR/lc
Genus: Spilogale
 Eastern spotted skunk, Spilogale putorius LR/lc
 Southern spotted skunk, Spilogale angustifrons
Suborder: Pinnipedia
Family: Phocidae (earless seals)
Genus: Neomonachus
Caribbean monk seal, Neomonachus tropicalis EX

Order: Perissodactyla (odd-toed ungulates)

The odd-toed ungulates are browsing and grazing mammals. They are usually large to very large, and have relatively simple stomachs and a large middle toe.

Family: Tapiridae (tapirs)
Genus: Tapirus
 Baird's tapir, Tapirus bairdii EN

Order: Artiodactyla (even-toed ungulates)

The even-toed ungulates are ungulates whose weight is borne about equally by the third and fourth toes, rather than mostly or entirely by the third as in perissodactyls. There are about 220 artiodactyl species, including many that are of great economic importance to humans.

Family: Tayassuidae (peccaries)
Genus: Dicotyles
 Collared peccary, Dicotyles tajacu LC
Genus: Tayassu
 White-lipped peccary, Tayassu pecari NT
Family: Cervidae (deer)
Subfamily: Capreolinae
Genus: Mazama
 Central American red brocket, Mazama temama DD
Genus: Odocoileus
 Yucatan brown brocket, O. pandora VU
 White-tailed deer, O. virginianus LC

See also
Fauna of Belize
List of chordate orders
Lists of mammals by region
List of prehistoric mammals
Mammal classification
List of mammals described in the 2000s

Notes

References
 

Belize
Mammals

Belize